Paul Hilton (born 1970, Oldham, Lancashire), is an English actor on stage, radio, and TV.
He trained at the Welsh College of Music & Drama.

Biography
Hilton was born in Oldham, Lancashire in 1970.

He has starred as William Palmer in the Pilgrim radio dramas on BBC Radio 4's Afternoon Play series and appeared in TV programmes including Garrow's Law (as freethinker Joseph Hamer), The Bill, Silent Witness, Wire in the Blood, Midsomer Murders (in the episode "The Oblong Murders"), Robin Hood, and has had regular character roles in True Dare Kiss (as Dennis Tyler) and Casualty 1909 (as Henry Percy Dean).

Hilton also appeared in the film Klimt and as Mr. Earnshaw Snr. in Andrea Arnold's 2011 adaptation of Wuthering Heights.

In 2010, he appeared as Sandy in Mark Haddon's play Polar Bears at the Donmar Warehouse, and in 2011 played the title role in Marlowe's Doctor Faustus at Shakespeare's Globe. In July 2015, he was part of the premiere cast of Damon Albarn's new musical Wonder.land at the Manchester International Festival. For director Rufus Norris he was The Boson in Lucy Kirkwood's Mosquitoes (2017) at London's National Theatre.

He played the character of The Fool in the Deep Time Walk Mobile Guide, produced in 2016/7 by Jeremy Mortimer.

He appeared as Alexander, the husband of the protagonist Katherine (played by Florence Pugh) in the 2016 film Lady Macbeth, which transposed the action of the novel by Nikolai Leskov to the Northeast of England.

In 2017, he starred in the title role in a National Theatre Live production of Peter Pan.

He played the part of David Holmes in the television drama series A Very English Scandal, based upon John Preston's non-fiction book about the Thorpe affair.

In 2018, Hilton played E.M. Forster in the world premiere of Matthew Lopez's play The Inheritance at London's Young Vic, reprising his role in the West End and Broadway transfers. In 2020, he received a Tony Award nomination for Best Featured Actor in a Play, a Drama League Award nomination for Distinguished Performance, and won the Drama Desk Award for Outstanding Featured Actor in a Play for his performance.

Awards and nominations

References

External links

1970 births
Living people
Male actors from Oldham
English male stage actors
English male television actors
English male radio actors
Alumni of the Royal Welsh College of Music & Drama
20th-century English male actors
21st-century English male actors